Lesbian, gay, bisexual, and transgender (LGBT) persons in Comoros face legal challenges not experienced by non-LGBT residents. LGBT persons are regularly prosecuted by the government and additionally face stigmatization among the broader population.

Law regarding same-sexual activity
Both male and female same-sex sexual acts are illegal in Comoros. Such acts are punished with up to five years imprisonment and a fine of 50,000 to 1,000,000 francs.

Recognition of same-sex relationships
There is no recognition of legal rights for same-sex couples.

Discrimination protections
There is no legal protection against discrimination based on sexual orientation or gender identity.

Living conditions
The U.S. Department of State's 2010 Human Rights Report found that "persons engaging in homosexual activity did not publicly discuss their sexual orientation due to societal pressure. There are no lesbian, gay, bisexual, and transgender organizations in the country."

Summary table

See also

Human rights in Comoros
LGBT rights in Africa

References

Law of the Comoros